Verkhneutyashevo (Ürge Ütäş) is a rural locality (a village) in Utyashevsky Selsoviet, Belokataysky District, Bashkortostan, Russia. The population was 248 as of 2010. There are 3 streets.

Geography 
Verkhneutyashevo is located 10 km south of Novobelokatay (the district's administrative centre) by road. Atarsha is the nearest rural locality.

References 

Rural localities in Belokataysky District